The 2006 Cheltenham Gold Cup was a horse race which took place at Cheltenham on Friday 17 March 2006. It was the 78th running of the Cheltenham Gold Cup, and it was won by War of Attrition. The winner was ridden by Conor O'Dwyer and trained by Mouse Morris. The pre-race favourite Beef or Salmon finished eleventh.

For the first time in the race's history the first three finishers – War of Attrition, Hedgehunter and Forget the Past – were all trained in Ireland.

Race details
 Sponsor: Totesport
 Winner's prize money: £228,080.00
 Going: Good
 Number of runners: 22
 Winner's time: 6m 31.7s

Full result

* The distances between the horses are shown in lengths or shorter. nk = neck; PU = pulled-up; UR = unseated rider.† Trainers are based in Great Britain unless indicated.Note: Fence 20 was omitted due to the injured jockey Timmy Murphy, unseated at the fence on the first circuit.

Winner's details
Further details of the winner, War of Attrition:

 Foaled: 7 May 1999 in Ireland
 Sire: Presenting; Dam: Una Juna (Good Thyne)
 Owner: Gigginstown House Stud
 Breeder: Bridget Murphy

References
 
 sportinglife.com
 bbc.co.uk – "War of Attrition claims Gold Cup" – March 17, 2006.

Cheltenham Gold Cup
 2006
Cheltenham Gold Cup
Cheltenham Gold Cup
2000s in Gloucestershire